The Trans-Canada Network was the name assigned to the main English-language radio network of the Canadian Broadcasting Corporation to distinguish it from the CBC's second network, the Dominion Network. Today, it is known as CBC Radio One. The Trans-Canada Network branding was inaugurated on January 1, 1944 when the Dominion Network was launched; due to the CBC's existing programming contracts, however, the networks operated on an interim basis for the first several months of 1944, before officially launching in September.

The Trans-Canada Network was the principal service of the CBC and focused more on serious programming such as news, public affairs, classical music and educational programming while the Dominion Network carried lighter, more commercial fare. However, both networks aired commercials.

While the Dominion Network was made up almost entirely of privately owned affiliates (with the exception of the flagship station CJBC in Toronto), most Trans-Canada Network stations were owned by the CBC, although in some smaller communities, a private station would be required to air several hours a day of Trans-Canada Network programming. 

In 1962 the Dominion Network was dissolved and the Trans-Canada Network became known simply as CBC or CBC Radio, and significantly adjusted its affiliation agreements accordingly. Over the next decade the CBC established a new second English-language network of FM stations that, in 1975, became officially known as CBC Stereo to distinguish it from the AM CBC Radio network. In 1997, as many CBC Radio stations had moved to FM, the networks were redesignated CBC Radio One and CBC Radio 2.

References

CBC Radio
Defunct Canadian radio networks
1944 establishments in Canada
1962 disestablishments in Canada